The Zambezi Region is one of the 14 regions of Namibia. It is located in the north-eastern part of the country. It is largely concurrent with the major Zambezi River where it gets its name from. The region has eight constituencies and its capital is the town of Katima Mulilo. The self-governed village Bukalo is also found in this region. The Zambezi Region had a population of 90,596 in 2011. As of 2020, it had 47,884 registered voters.

Politics

The region comprises eight electoral constituencies:
 Judea Lyaboloma
 Kabbe North
 Kabbe South
 Katima Mulilo Rural
 Katima Mulilo Urban
 Kongola
 Linyanti
 Sibinda

In the 2015 regional elections SWAPO won in all eight constituencies and obtained 77.5% of all votes (2010: 80%). In the 2020 regional election SWAPO still had the vast majority of votes (45.4%) but lost four of the eight constituencies, three to independent candidates and one to the Independent Patriots for Change (IPC), an opposition party formed in August 2020.

Geography
The Zambezi Region is situated is a tropical area, with high temperatures and much rainfall during the December-to-March rainy season, making it the wettest region of Namibia. The terrain is mostly made up of swamps, floodplains, wetlands and woodland.

In addition to the Zambezi River, the strip also holds the Kwando River, which marks the border with Botswana. Tributaries of the river here go by different names, including the Linyanti and the Chobe.  The province's far east is where the Kwando meets the Zambezi.

Katima Mulilo is the largest city, with other notable villages and settlements including Chefuzwe, Lusese, Bukalo, Kalimbeza, Isize, Luhonono, Mafuta, Liselo, Musanga, Kongola, Chinchimane, Bukalo, Sibinda, and Impalila, along with Kayuo, Wenela, Mapulanga, Sambeso, Katembo, Siambiza, Luzibalule, Sachona, Lubuta, Mulanga, Mashambo, Omega Ill, Chetto, Bwabwata, Gaucha, Geusha, Yishesha, Sekrige, Singalamwe, Choi, Ngonga, Muneambuanas, Dipito, Sangwali, Photo, Sikwalo, Matengu, Yaka, Linyati, Muketela, Sibbinda, Chengere, Sebukis, Katonga, and Sachinga.

Borders
The Zambezi Region is almost entirely surrounded by foreign countries. Its only domestic border is a short connection in the west with Kavango East.
In the northwest, it borders the Cuando Cubango Province of Angola.
In the north, it borders the Western Province of Zambia.
In the south, it borders the North-West District of Botswana.

The Namibia-Zambia-Botswana tripoint lies less than 100 metres from the Zimbabwe border and as such Namibia is sometimes erroneously thought to border Zimbabwe.

Flora and fauna
The region is home to 450 animal species, including elephants, making the Zambezi Region a popular game-watching spot. The wildlife is protected by several national parks, Bwabwata National Park, Nkasa Rupara National Park (previously known as Mamili National Park), and Mudumu National Park; animals travel freely across the unmarked border with Botswana, where the Chobe National Park lies. The Caprivi strip is also a prime bird-watching area, with almost 70 percent of bird species found in Namibia being recorded here.

Population
Over 90,000 people live in the Zambezi Region of Namibia, about four percent of Namibia's population.  The population is mostly composed of subsistence farmers who make their living on the banks of the Zambezi, Kwando, Linyanti and Chobe Rivers. 33,000 are part of the Subia people and about 17,000 are part of the Lozi people amongst other ethnic groups such as Mafwe, Mbalangwe, Yeyi and Totela. According to Ethnologue, Silozi is the lingua franca.

Economy and infrastructure
According to the 2012 Namibia Labour Force Survey, unemployment in the Zambezi Region is 28.0%. Zambezi has 102 schools with a total of 39,808 pupils.

Tourism
Deciduous woodlands are dominated by trees such as wild seringa, copalwood and Zambezi teak. While the park is sanctuary to 35 large and numerous small game species, visitors are not likely to see many of these animals as vehicles are restricted to the road between Kavango and Eastern Caprivi. Animals likely to be seen are elephant, roan and kudu, buffalo occur towards the west. As many as 339 bird species have been recorded in the west of the Zambezi Region.

The wild and little visited Nkasa Rupara National Park (formerly Mamili National Park) is Namibia's equivalent of the Okavango Delta, a watery wonderland of wildlife rich islands, river channels and wetlands. The focal points of the  national park are Nkasa and Lupala, two large islands in the Kwando/Linyati river. During the dry season the islands can be reached by road but after the rains 80% of the area becomes flooded, cutting them off from the mainland.

Mudumu National Park is a vast  expanse of dense savannah and mopane woodland with the Kwando River at its western border. The park is home to small populations of sitatunga and red lechwe while spotted neck otter, hippo and crocodile inhabit the waterways. Animals to be encountered are elephant, buffalo, roan, sable, kudu, impala, oribi, zebra, wild dog as well as some 430 species of birds.

The Namibian Wetland Route, established in 2005, is a local tourism association of businesses along a route from Divundu to Impalila.

History

Until the end of the 19th century, the area was known as Itenge, and it was under the rule of the Lozi kings. In the late 19th century the strip of land was administered as part of the British protectorate of Bechuanaland (Botswana). The German Empire in 1890 laid claim to the British-administered island of Zanzibar; Britain objected and the dispute was settled at the Berlin Conference later that year.  On 1 July 1890, the British acquired Zanzibar and Germany acquired the territory which became known as the Caprivi Strip. Caprivi was named after German Chancellor Leo von Caprivi, who negotiated the land in an 1890 exchange with the United Kingdom. Leo von Caprivi arranged for the Caprivi strip to be annexed to German South West Africa in order to give Germany access to the Zambezi River as part of the Heligoland-Zanzibar Treaty. The German motivation behind the swap was to acquire a strip of land linking German South West Africa with the Zambezi River, providing easy access to Tanganyika (Tanzania) and an outlet to the Indian Ocean. Unfortunately for the Germans, the British colonisation of Rhodesia (Zimbabwe and Zambia) stopped them well upstream of Victoria Falls, which proved a considerable barrier to navigation on the Zambezi.

During World War I, the Caprivi Strip again came under British rule and was governed as part of Bechuanaland but it received little attention and became known as a lawless frontier.  The region became of geopolitical importance during the 1980s when it was used as a jumping off point and re-supply route for South African support for the UNITA movement in Angola.

Caprivi Region became one of Namibia's thirteen regions when the country gained independence in 1990.

Renaming
In August 2013, following a recommendation of the fourth Delimitation Commission for the Electoral Commission of Namibia, the Caprivi Region was renamed the Zambezi Region in a step to eliminate names of colonial administrators from Namibia's maps.  Alternative proposals for the region's name had included Iyambezi, Linyandi, Itenge, and others.  The name of the Zambezi town of Schuckmannsburg was also changed to Luhonono as part of the same process.

The renaming was not without controversy, however.  The group Concerned Caprivians (or Caprivi Concerned Group) released a press statement expressing concern over the name change as well as Delimitation Commission boundary and constituency demarcation changes. Caprivi African National Union (CANU) party secretary general Robert Sililo argued that the renaming was motivated by a desire to dilute Caprivian identity and history.  A statement from Concerned Caprivians read, "the name change from Caprivi to Zambezi is destined to destroy our identity and history as a symbol of renaissance, the dilution of political foundations in the identity of CANU party".

References

External links

 
Regions of Namibia